Muy Dentro de Mi Corazón ("Very deep in my heart") is the fifth album recorded by Mexican singer Alejandro Fernández. Produced by Pedro Ramírez. He shoot videos for the songs "Nube Viajera" and "Abrazame". Other songs known from this album are "Moño Negro" and "Es La Mujer". It received a nomination for a Grammy Award for Best Mexican/Mexican-American Album and Regional Mexican Album of the Year at the Lo Nuestro Awards of 1998.

Track listing
 "Dentro De Mi Corazon"  – 3:17
 "Como Puede Ser"  – 3:46
 "Nube Viajera"  – 4:04
 "Que Digan Misa"  – 2:26
 "Es La Mujer"  – 2:58
 "Ya Se Que Dices"  – 3:18
 "Moño Negro"  – 2:24
 "Abrazame"  – 3:18
 "Me Llevaras En Ti"  – 3:43
 "Es Cosa De Hombres"  – 3:02
 "Chatita Querida"  – 2:15
 "Popurri Caribeño" ("La Paloma"/"Cuando Salí de Cuba"/"He Perdido Una Perla")  – 5:35

Chart performance

Album

Singles

Sales and certifications

References

1996 albums
Alejandro Fernández albums